Paul Murphy  (1942 or 1943 – 20 October 2020) was an Australian political journalist and radio and television presenter.

Career
He presented the ABC's afternoon radio current affairs program PM for a decade from 1983 to 1993.

Among his favourite moments on the program during his time there was the coverage of the final caucus showdown between Bob Hawke and Paul Keating.

In the 1994 Australia Day Honours Murphy was made a Member of the Order of Australia (AM) for "service to public broadcasting and to journalism".

In 2000, he was awarded the Walkley Award for Most Outstanding Contribution to Journalism.

Murphy died from cancer on 20 October 2020, aged 77.

References

1940 births
2020 deaths
Australian political journalists
Australian television journalists
deaths from cancer in Australia
members of the Order of Australia
Walkley Award winners